The 1983–84 Copa del Rey was the 82nd staging of the Spanish Cup, the annual domestic football cup competition in Spain. The tournament was attended by 136 teams from the higher echelons of Spanish football.

The tournament began on 7 September 1983 and ended on 5 May 1984 with the final, held in Santiago Bernabéu Stadium, in Madrid.

FC Barcelona played their second consecutive final but lost to Athletic Bilbao in a match remembered for its incidents, toughness and especially the scuffle at the end. The match was preceded by controversial statements from both sides and with memories of the previous game in which Maradona was seriously injured. Once the game finished, Maradona himself started a fight that ended with all players in a pitched battle.

The match ended with a 1–0 victory for the Basque team. This was their twenty-third win in this competition and was part of their fifth double.

Format 

 All rounds are played over two legs except the final which is played a single match in a neutral venue. The team that has the higher aggregate score over the two legs progresses to the next round.
 In case of a tie on aggregate, will play an extra time of 30 minutes, and if still tied, will be decided with a penalty shoot-outs.
 The teams that play European competitions are exempt until the round of 16 or when they are removed from the tournament.
 The winners of the competition will earn a place in the group stage of next season's UEFA Cup Winners' Cup, if they have not already qualified for European competition, if so then the runners-up will instead take this berth.

First round

Second round

Third round

Fourth round

Bracket

Round of 16 

|}

First leg

Second leg

Quarter-finals 

|}

First leg

Second leg

Semi-finals 

|}

First leg

Second leg

Final

References

External links 

  RSSSF
  Linguasport

Copa del Rey seasons
1983–84 in Spanish football cups